Good Hope FM is Cape Town's leading music focused interactive lifestyle radio station, whose Contemporary Hit Radio format provides a music mix of R&B, Pop, Hip Hop and Dance. Good Hope FM targets young, global, routed and now generation listeners. The Good Hope FM footprint covers the Cape including the city, surrounding towns and villages the Overberg and Plettenberg Bay, targeting young, global, routed and now generation listeners. The station has a target audience of LSM 6-9, 22-32 year olds.

The intrinsic offering is:

 Entertainment (music, competitions, entertaining features)

 Information (news, weather, sport, traffic and surf reports)

 Community involvement (fundraising, interviews, sponsorships, events)

 Commercial Advertising Platform

Good Hope FM contributes to the development of South African music and local content through a consistent delivery according to ICASA guidelines and expectations.  The station hosts regular interviews with local artists and continues to support the local music industry.

The station broadcasts predominantly in English with English/Afrikaans news, traffic reports and commercials.

Good Hope FM is a SABC commercial radio station and was launched in 1965.  The station is a well-established Cape Town brand and will keep on providing the ideal platform for advertisers to reach the affluent 20-something market of metropolitan Cape Town.

Coverage & Frequencies
The Good Hope FM broadcast footprint covers Cape Town metropolis and surrounding suburbs, towns and villages and also extends to the Overberg and Plettenberg Bay regions.  The surrounding towns and villages include Langebaan, Saldanha Bay, Malmesbury, Paarl, Wellington, Worcester, Franschhoek, Stellenbosch and Gordon's Bay.

Broadcast Languages
English (predominantly)
Afrikaans

Broadcast Time
24/7, 365 days a year

Listenership Figures

References

External links
Good Hope FM Website

Radio stations in Cape Town
Contemporary hit radio stations
Radio stations established in 1965